Signalman is a person who historically gave signals using flags and light.

Signalman may also refer to:

Signalman (rank), the military rank
Signalman (rail), a railwayman who operates the points and signals in a railway signal box
The Signal-Man, an 1866 short story by Charles Dickens
 The Signalman (film), a 1976 BBC television adaptation
Signalman (comics), a villain in the Batman comics
 A ranger-like ally in Gekisou Sentai Carranger